The Fifth Labour Government of New Zealand was the government of New Zealand from 10 December 1999 to 19 November 2008. Labour Party leader Helen Clark negotiated a coalition with Jim Anderton, leader of the Alliance Party. While undertaking a number of substantial reforms, it was not particularly radical compared to previous Labour governments.

Overview
The previous government, the fourth National government, had been in power since 1990. It was widely unpopular by 1999, with much of the public antagonised by a series of free-market economic reforms, and was bedevilled by weakness and instability. In the 1999 general election, the Helen Clark-led Labour Party defeated the National Party easily, becoming the largest single party in the House of Representatives. Labour formed a minority coalition government with the left-leaning Alliance party, supported by the Green Party.

During its first term, the government pursued a number of reforms. The controversial Employment Contracts Act was repealed, replaced by an Employment Relations Act more friendly to unions and collective bargaining; a state-owned bank, Kiwibank, was created at the behest of the Alliance; a majority stake in the national airline, Air New Zealand, was purchased; and the public health sector was reorganised with the re-establishment of partly elected district health boards. Closing the Gaps, an affirmative action strategy targeting socio-economic inequalities between Māori and Pacific Island ethnic groups and other groups, was a particularly controversial reform among right-wing National and ACT voters.

With the disintegration of the Alliance in 2002, Helen Clark called a snap election, even though she still had the confidence of the House. Labour handily won the election. The Alliance failed to return to parliament, although a rump returned as Jim Anderton's Progressives. Labour formed a coalition with the Progressives, and turned to the centrist United Future party for confidence and supply. This second term was notable largely for its social and constitutional legislation, with the Government establishing a Supreme Court and ending appeals to the Privy Council, decriminalising prostitution, and providing for civil unions, the latter two changes in particular supported by the Green Party and opposed by United Future. The Government was also faced in this term with the foreshore and seabed controversy. While Labour, in cooperation with the New Zealand First party, eventually resolved the legal dispute by vesting foreshore and seabed title in the Crown, a dissident Labour minister, Tariana Turia, formed the Māori Party, while on the other side of the spectrum a resurgent National Party, now under former Reserve Bank governor Don Brash, became considerably more popular. In the 2005 election, the Government was returned with a slim margin on the strength of the Working for Families assistance package and financial assistance to students, benefiting also from mistakes in National's campaign.

Helen Clark moved even more to the centre, enlisting support for her Government from both New Zealand First and United Future. Almost immediately, the Government parties became involved in a protracted funding scandal, having apparently used public money for party political purposes during the election campaign. A heavy-handed attempt at campaign finance reform later in this term also harmed the Government, which by now appeared tired and at a loss for direction, although it did succeed in implementing a wide range of social and economic reforms during its time in office.

In a 2000 feature article "Siege of Helengrad", The Australian newspaper wrote that Clark's "uncompromisingly autocratic and pervasive leadership has seen New Zealand dubbed Helengrad". In January 2008, the term 'Helengrad', "a noun used to describe the iron grip of New Zealand's prime minister over Wellington", was reported as having made Australia's Macquarie online dictionary among 85 other new words.

In the 2008 election, the Labour Party lost convincingly to National, and the government was succeeded by the National Party led by John Key as Prime Minister.

Significant policies

Economic
 Created Kiwibank as part of coalition agreement with the Alliance (2001).
 Created the New Zealand Superannuation Fund (2001);
 KiwiSaver retirement savings scheme (2007);
 Purchased a majority stake in Air New Zealand (2001); 
 Renationalised New Zealand's national rail network (Under ONTRACK) (2004), and in 2008 the rail and ferry operations of Toll New Zealand (renamed KiwiRail). KiwiRail and ONTRACK were then merged into one organisation;
 Buy Kiwi Made campaign (2007);
 Telecommunications industry reform, particularly local loop unbundling (2007).
 Increased top income tax rate to 39% (2000).
 Company and personal income tax cuts under the 2008 New Zealand budget.
 Began the Crown Retail Deposit Guarantee Scheme, deposit insurance for New Zealand financial institutions during the Great Recession (2008).

Constitutional
 Established the Supreme Court of New Zealand, replacing appeals to the Judicial Committee of the Privy Council (2004).
 Constitutional Inquiry into the Constitution of New Zealand.
 Passed the Electoral Finance Act to reform electoral spending and regulate electoral advertising (2007).

Treaty of Waitangi
 New Zealand foreshore and seabed controversy; passed the Foreshore and Seabed Act (2004).
 Marine and Coastal Area (Takutai Moana) Act 2011

Treaty settlements:

Aspects of the Clark-led governments actions in relation to the Treaty of Waitangi is shown through settlements.

 Treaty 2U exhibition funding
 New Zealand School Curriculum launch
 Moriori heritage and Identity preservation
 Te Arawa Apology
 Te Uri O Hau
 Waitangi Day Commemorative Fund
 Fisheries Scholarship

Social policy
 Within 3 weeks of taking office, the government had announced an increase in the minimum wage, removed the interest on student loans for full-time and low-income students while they were still studying, announced the reversal of accident compensation deregulation, and introduced legislation to increase taxation for those on higher incomes.
 Introduced paid parental leave of 12 weeks (2001), increasing to 14 weeks by the end of the government.
 The Working for Families package was introduced in 2004, which significantly improved social welfare assistance for low-income families and contributed to a reduction in child poverty from 28% in 2004 to 22% in 2007.
 The wage-related floor of the state pension was restored.
 The Housing Restructuring Amendment Bill (2000) provided for income-related rents and set them at 25% of household income making community housing much more affordable than it had become under the previous Government's market rental strategy.
 Equity Funding was introduced (2002), which provided additional funding to community-based ECE services most in need.
 Research funding was increased.
 The New Zealand Transport Strategy (released in December 2002) provided increased funding for initiatives to promote the use of buses, trains, cycling and walking.
 The minimum wage was increased by more than 5% each year (well above the rate of inflation) during the labour-led government's second term.
 The Health and Safety in Employment Amendment Act (2002) served to make the principal Act more comprehensive by covering more industries and more conditions.
 The ring-fencing of mental health money and the creation of more than 800 FTE mental health staff positions see this promise coded as fulfilled representing a 100% fulfilment rate for this policy area.
 ICT was expanded to students in remote areas so they could receive specialist teaching.
 The Holidays Act (2003) entitled employees to receive "time and a half" for working on any statutory holiday from 2004 onwards and provided for four weeks' annual leave from 2007 onwards.
 Passed the Prostitution Reform Act 2003
 Passed the Property (Relationships) Act: treats de facto relationships the same as after the breakup of legal marriages, unless the individuals in the relationship contract out of the Act;
 Civil Union Act 2004
 Supported the Crimes (Substituted Section 59) Amendment Act 2007, which repealed and replaced section 59 of the Crimes Act 1961, which allowed "reasonable force" in the discipline of children.
 National Statement on Religious Diversity (2007)
 National Superannuation payments for married couples were increased (2000).
 A Parental Tax Credit was introduced (2000).
 A Child Tax Credit (which replaced the independent Family Tax Credit) was introduced (2000).
 A Family Tax Credit (which was formerly the Guaranteed Minimum Family income) was introduced (2000).
 A Modern Apprentices initiative was introduced to develop technological skills (2000).
 The Family Start programme was expanded (2000).
 Annual inflation to benefits was introduced (2000).
 Closing the Gaps policy platform introduced (2000).
 The Social Security Amendment Act of 2001 introduced various changes such as "disestablishment of the Community Wage, re-establishment of an unemployment benefit and non-work-tested sickness benefit, and the abolition of the work capacity assessment process".
 The Social Security Amendment Act (2006) established three streams for reintegrating beneficiaries into the larger community. These included a work support stream for the unemployed, a work support development stream for most other beneficiaries, and a community support stream for a small group to be exempted from work, training or planning requirements.
 Income-related rents for state-owned housing were restored (2000).
 A social allocation system was introduced and implemented with the income-related rents scheme(2000).
 Vacant sales were frozen and the Home Buy programme was ended (2000).
 Bulk funding for schools was ended (2000).
 Expenditure was increased, or newly allocated, for the reduction of attrition of students from school, tertiary education subsidies, Maori and Pacific peoples' teacher recruitment, and Homework Centres (2000).
 Interest on student loans while students are studying was abolished, while the decision of the Fourth National Government to increase the student loan repayment rate was reversed (2000).
 Interest on student loans abolished for borrowers who remain in New Zealand (or studying overseas).
 Tertiary student fees were kept stable (2001).
 Expenditure for early childhood education was increased (2001).
 The National Certificate of Educational Achievement was established (2001).
 New funding was provided for principals' leadership and professional development (2001).
 An In Work Payment was introduced to replace the Child Tax Credit.
 The ministries that handled work and income and those that did social policy were merged to create a new Ministry of Social Development (2001).

Health
 Creation of district health boards (2000).
 Dissolution of the Health Funding Authority, with its responsibilities given to the Ministry of Health and the district health boards.
 Introduction of the Primary Health Care Strategy, moving primary care funding towards capitation ('bulk funding'), and away from fee-for-service funding (2001).

Environment
 Royal Commission on Genetically Modified Organisms
 Sandra Lee enacted the Local Government Act 2002 (New Zealand).
 In 2002, the Climate Change Response Act 2002 was enacted in order to ratify Kyoto Protocol to the UNFCCC.
 In September 2008, the New Zealand Emissions Trading Scheme was enacted through the Climate Change Response (Emissions Trading) Amendment Act 2008.

National identity
 Completed Establishing a fully New Zealand-based honours system (2000).

Foreign affairs
 Signed free trade agreements with Brunei, Chile, China, Singapore, and Thailand.
 Scrapped the combat wing of the Royal New Zealand Air Force.
 Sent a detachment of SAS troops to the war in Afghanistan.
 Sent troops to Solomon Islands as part of the Regional Assistance Mission to Solomon Islands
 Sent troops to East Timor during the 2006 East Timorese crisis.
 Sent troops and police to Tonga after the 2006 Nuku‘alofa riots.
 Did not send combat troops to the Iraq War.
 Launched Project Protector, to expand the Royal New Zealand Navy's capacity.
 Launched free trade negotiations with South Korea and Japan.

Appointments
The following positions were appointed by the Queen on the advice of the Government:

Governor-General
 The Hon. Dame Silvia Cartwright (2001–2006)
 The Right Hon. Sir Anand Satyanand (2006–2011)

Supreme Court
With the creation of the Supreme Court of New Zealand in 2003, the government appointed the first full bench of the Court.
 Chief Justice The Right Hon. Dame Sian Elias (1 July 2004)
  Justice The Hon. Sir Thomas Gault (1 July 2004)
  Justice The Hon. Sir Kenneth Keith (1 July 2004)
  Justice The Hon. Sir Peter Blanchard (1 July 2004)
  Justice The Hon. Sir Andrew Tipping (1 July 2004)
  Justice The Hon. John McGrath (4 May 2005)
  Justice The Hon. Sir Noel Crossley Anderson (21 February 2006)
  Justice The Hon. Bill Wilson (21 December 2007)

Acting judges were also appointed from the retired judges of the Court of Appeal:
 The Hon. Justice Sir John Henry
 The Hon. Justice Sir Ted Thomas
 Former President of the Court of Appeal Sir Ivor Richardson
 Former Chief Justice Sir Thomas Eichelbaum.

Court of Appeal
The government appointed three presidents of the Court of Appeal of New Zealand:
 The Right Hon. Sir William Young, KNZM 23 February 2006 – 1 July 2010
  The Hon Sir Noel Crossley Anderson, KNZM 1 January 2004 – 23 February 2006
 The Right Hon. Sir Thomas Gault, KNZM 24 May 2002 – 31 December 2003

Formation

The Fifth Labour government was elected in the 1999 general election, after entering a coalition with the Alliance Party and a confidence and supply agreement with the Green Party. Labour managed to increase their percentage of the votes by 10.5% and won 12 more seats than in the 1996 election. With this coalition in place the Labour Party returned to government for the first time in nine years, and Helen Clark became New Zealand's first elected female Prime Minister. The 1999 election also became Labour's first successful MMP election.

The 2002 election
The 2002 Election was held a few weeks before the Parliamentary term elapsed. This had only occurred twice before in New Zealand's political history, in 1951 and 1984. The Government cited the collapse of the Alliance Party, with whom they had entered a coalition in 1999 as the reason for the earlier date. The Alliance Party had split after Jim Anderton, their leader, left to form the Progressive Coalition Party. However, some critics believe that Labour could have continued to govern for the remaining few weeks. They say that the election was called early to capitalise on high opinion poll ratings before they could be undermined by a potential softening in the New Zealand economic performance.

After initial polls indicated Labour may have enough votes to govern alone, a feat which had never occurred under MMP in New Zealand, they won 41.3% of the vote and 52 seats. Although this meant they improved on their results in the 1999 election, it was not enough to govern alone. As a result, Labour entered a coalition with the new Progressive Coalition Party. Additionally, they entered a confidence and supply agreement with United Future. Labour's success was highlighted by the National Party's demise as they accrued a record low 20.9% of the vote.

The 2005 election
After some initial doubt as to what date the election would be held, 17 September was the chosen day. After falling behind National in the initial opinion polls, Labour fought back to obtain 41.1% of the vote. Although this saw a 0.2% decrease from the previous election, it still saw them sit ahead of National by 2%. The 2005 election saw a dramatic fall in the success of the minor parties. New Zealand First and United Future each won less than half of the percentage of total votes they achieved in 2002. In order to reach the required majority, Labour entered confidence and supply agreements with New Zealand First and United Future. This was done in addition to a coalition agreement with the Progressive Coalition Party, of whom only Jim Anderton obtained a seat.

The newly formed Maori Party accrued four seats. After only being formed in 2004 as a result of the controversial Foreshore and Seabed Act they oversaw a successful campaign based on a critical assessment of Labour's record with Maori issues. Their success was highlighted by the decline of ACT New Zealand, who won two seats, and the Progressive Coalition and United Future who each won only a single seat.

Defeat

Election results
The following table shows the total votes* for Labour, plus parties supporting the Labour-led government. For more details of election results, see the relevant election articles.

* 'Votes' means party votes only. 'Seats' means both list and electorate seats.

Notes
 Following the 1999 election, Labour formed a coalition with the Alliance Party, and gained support on matters of confidence and supply from the Greens.
 Following the 2002 election, Labour formed a coalition with the Progressive Party, and gained support on matters of confidence and supply from United Future. The Greens also entered into a formal agreement with the government, but it was not as strong as the agreements covering confidence and supply it made in the preceding and following parliaments.
 Following the 2005 election, Labour formed a coalition with the Progressive Party, and gained support on matters of confidence and supply from New Zealand First and United Future. The Greens signed an agreement to abstain on votes of confidence and supply, giving the Labour-led Government a majority. The Māori Party also abstained on confidence and supply votes but had no formal agreement with the Government.

Prime minister

Helen Clark was Prime Minister from when the government was elected in 1999 until it was defeated by the National Party in the 2008 elections.

Cabinet Ministers

See also
 Governments of New Zealand
 New Zealand Labour Party

References

Further reading
 Boston, Jonathan. Left Turn: The New Zealand general election of 1999 (Victoria U.P, 2000)

 
 Levine, Stephen and Nigel S. Roberts, eds. The Baubles of Office: The New Zealand General Election of 2005 (Victoria U.P, 2007)
 Levine, Stephen and Nigel S. Roberts, eds. Key to Victory: The New Zealand General Election of 2008 (Victoria U.P, 2010)
 Welch, Denis. Helen Clark: A Political Life (2009) 240pp

Ministries of Elizabeth II
Labour 5
New Zealand Labour Party
1999 in New Zealand
2000s in New Zealand
1999 establishments in New Zealand
2008 disestablishments in New Zealand
Cabinets established in 1999
Cabinets disestablished in 2008
Helen Clark
Coalition governments